The 2015 Lebanese Elite Cup is the 18th edition of this football tournament in Lebanon. The competition started on 11 September through to the final on 27 September. This tournament includes the six best teams from the 2014–15 Lebanese Premier League season.

Group stage

Group A

Group B

Final stage

Semi finals

Final

Lebanese Elite Cup seasons
Elite